Aalbach may refer to:
 Aalbach (Main), a river of Bavaria and Baden-Württemberg, Germany
 Lößnitz (Nebel), a river of  Mecklenburg-Vorpommern, Germany, known in its upper reaches as Aalbach
 Aalbach (Tollense), the outflow of Malliner See,  Mecklenburg-Vorpommern, Germany